"Na Na Hey Hey Kiss Him Goodbye" is a 1969 song written and recorded by Paul Leka, Gary DeCarlo and Dale Frashuer, attributed to a then-fictitious band Steam. It was released under the Mercury subsidiary label Fontana and became a number one pop single on the Billboard Hot 100 in late 1969, and remained on the charts in early 1970.

Original recording 
Paul Leka, Gary DeCarlo and Dale Frashuer wrote a blues shuffle version of the song in the early 1960s when they were members of a doo-wop group from Bridgeport, Connecticut, called the Glenwoods, the Citations, and the Chateaus, of which Leka was the piano player. The group disbanded when Leka talked Frashuer into going into New York City with him to write and possibly produce. In 1969, DeCarlo (using the professional name Garrett Scott) recorded four songs at Mercury Records in New York with Leka as producer. The singles impressed the company's executives, who wanted to issue all of them as A-side singles. In need of a B-side, Leka and DeCarlo resurrected an old song from their days as the Glenwoods, "Kiss Him Goodbye", with their old bandmate, Frashuer.

With DeCarlo as lead vocalist, they recorded the song in one recording session. Instead of using a full band, Leka played keyboards and had engineer Warren Dewey splice together a drum track from one of DeCarlo's four singles and a conga drum solo by Ange DiGeronimo recorded in Leka's Bridgeport, Connecticut, studio for an entirely different session. "I said we should put a chorus to it (to make it longer)", Leka told Fred Bronson in The Billboard Book of Number One Hits. "I started writing while I was sitting at the piano going 'na, na, na, na, na, na, na, na'... Everything was 'na na' when you didn't have a lyric." Gary added "hey hey".

"Na Na Hey Hey Kiss Him Goodbye" reached number one in the United States for two weeks, on December 6 and 13, 1969; it was Billboards final multi-week number 1 hit of the 1960s and also peaked at number twenty on the soul chart. In Canada, the song reached number six. By the beginning of the 21st century, sales of "Na Na Hey Hey Kiss Him Goodbye" had exceeded 6.5 million records, attaining Multi-Platinum record status.

Bananarama version 

In February 1983, UK girl group Bananarama released the song as a single from their album Deep Sea Skiving. This version became a top ten hit in the United Kingdom (number 5), but only a minor hit in the US (Billboard number 101) later that year.

This was the fifth single released from their first album in 1983.
It peaked at number five in the UK singles chart, and number 38 in Australia on the Kent Music Report chart.

Track listing 
 UK & USA 7" vinyl single
UK: London Records NANA 4; USA: London Records 810 115-7
"Na Na Hey Hey Kiss Him Goodbye" 3:22
"Tell Tale Signs" 2:58

 UK 12" vinyl single
London Records NANX 4
"Na Na Hey Hey Kiss Him Goodbye" (Extended Version) 4:52
"Na Na Hey Hey Na (Dub) Hey" 4:12
"Tell Tale Signs" (Extended Version) 4:46

Music video 
The music video features the band playing in a school playground and then being made to move by a group of men. They then decide to join a boxing club so the video features them singing the song whilst boxing. By the end of the video they return to the playground wearing leathers and this time make the group of men move away. They then ride off into the night on motorbikes.

The Nylons version 

In 1987, Canadian quartet the Nylons released an a cappella version of this song as a single under the shortened title "Kiss Him Goodbye". It became their biggest hit on the Billboard Hot 100, peaking at number twelve that summer, and reaching number 15 in Canada.

Track listing 
 Canada & USA 7" vinyl single
Canada: Attic Records AT 348; USA: Open Air Records OS-0022
"Kiss Him Goodbye" 3:24
"It's What They Call Magic" 3:49

 Canada & USA 12" vinyl single
Canada: Attic Records AT 1240; USA: Open Air Records OS-12240
"Kiss Him Goodbye (Sheer N.R.G. Mix)" 6:05
"Kiss Him Goodbye (Acapella Version)" 4:05
"Kiss Him Goodbye (Dub Version)" 5:15

Chart history

Weekly charts 
Steam original

Year-end charts 

Bananarama cover

In popular culture 
In 1977, Chicago White Sox organist Nancy Faust began playing the song. It had previously been sung spontaneously by fans in the stands, possibly beginning in a series with the Minnesota Twins July 1–3, 1977, a four-game series swept by the White Sox.  The fan version went "Minnesota, Minnesota, Hey Hey Good Bye".  Nancy Faust began playing it on the organ later that month. It is generally directed at the losing side in an elimination contest when the outcome is all but certain or when an individual player is ejected, disqualified, or more often in baseball games, a pitching change is made during an inning (which is when Faust would play it). It has also been sung by crowds in political rallies, to taunt political opponents or to drown out and mock disruptive counter-protesters.

This song was one of 164 included on the list of songs which were temporarily banned from public radio airplay by Clear Channel after 9/11.

On January 23, 2006, Paul Martin was defeated by Stephen Harper as Prime Minister of Canada. Martin had acceded to the prime ministry following the ouster of Jean Chrétien. The next day's issue of La Voix de l'Est, a French newspaper in Granby, Quebec, included a cartoon by Paquette showing Chrétien calling Martin and singing "Na Na Hey Hey Kiss Him Goodbye".

In April 2009, the song was sampled by American singer Kristinia DeBarge in her single "Goodbye".

On May 4, 2017, after the House of Representatives voted to pass the American Health Care Act which partially repealed the Patient Protection and Affordable Care Act, Democratic representatives chanted "Na na na na, hey hey, goodbye" to Republican representatives, implying that in voting for the bill, they would lose their House seats in the next election. DeCarlo was happy to hear of the song getting renewed exposure, but said he opposed Obamacare. It was not the first time the song had been sung in Congress; in 1993, after Democrats voted for then-President Bill Clinton's tax bill, House Republicans sang "Goodbye".

In January 2019, GMC launched an advertising campaign for its 2019 Sierra 1500 pickup truck, focusing on GMC's new MultiPro tailgate feature. The commercial shows owners of competing pickups carrying tailgates from those trucks and singing "Na Na Hey Hey Kiss Him Goodbye" while heading to the top of a mountain.

See also
 List of 1960s one-hit wonders in the United States

References

External links 
 

Songs about parting
Diss tracks
1969 debut singles
1983 singles
Fontana Records singles
London Records singles
Bananarama songs
Hermes House Band songs
Crazy Frog songs
Billboard Hot 100 number-one singles
Songs written by Paul Leka
1969 songs
Quotations from music
Catchphrases
1969 neologisms
Internet memes introduced in 2021
Political Internet memes
Bubblegum pop songs